Antipodogomphus acolythus is a species of dragonfly of the family Gomphidae, commonly known as the southern dragon. It inhabits streams, rivers and pools in eastern Australia.

Antipodogomphus acolythus is a small to medium-sized black and yellow dragonfly with a long tail.

Gallery

See also
 List of Odonata species of Australia

References

Gomphidae
Odonata of Australia
Insects of Australia
Endemic fauna of Australia
Taxa named by René Martin
Insects described in 1901